DD Gyan Darshan 1 is a state owned television channel telecasting from Doordarshan, Kendra, IGNOU. It is an educational media initiative of MHRD in collaboration with the Ministry of Information and Broadcasting (MIB), Prasar Bharati and ISRO with IGNOU as the nodal agency.

Broadcasting
It was initially launched on 26 January 2000 as a solitary 24x7 hour satellite channel under the banner of Doordarshan which provided a Transponder on INSAT 2B satellite, free of cost.

Gyan Darshan ran successfully until 2 June 2014 as a must carry channel for educational programmes. GD was shut down by ISRO to facilitate its migration from INSAT 3C to GSAT-10. IGNOU now needs to apply for a fresh license to start the up-linking of its channels for GSAT-10 Satellite.

Memorandum of Understanding was signed on 6 October 2016 between Doordarshan and IGNOU regarding the transmission of Four Gyan Darshan Educational channels in October. Gyan Darshan was likely to be resumed airing from 1 January 2017.

See also
 All India Radio
 DD Direct Plus
 Ministry of Information and Broadcasting
 List of programs broadcast by DD National
 List of South Asian television channels by country

References

External links
 
 Doordarshan news site
 An article at PFC

Doordarshan
Foreign television channels broadcasting in the United Kingdom
Television channels and stations established in 1997
Indian direct broadcast satellite services
Television stations in New Delhi